Wojciechów may refer to the following places in Poland:
Wojciechów, Lwówek Śląski County in Lower Silesian Voivodeship (south-west Poland)
Wojciechów, Złotoryja County in Lower Silesian Voivodeship (south-west Poland)
Wojciechów, Chełm County in Lublin Voivodeship (east Poland)
Wojciechów, Kraśnik County in Lublin Voivodeship (east Poland)
Wojciechów, Gmina Gomunice in Łódź Voivodeship (central Poland)
Wojciechów, Gmina Przedbórz in Łódź Voivodeship (central Poland)
Wojciechów, Lublin County in Lublin Voivodeship (east Poland)
Wojciechów, Opole Lubelskie County in Lublin Voivodeship (east Poland)
Wojciechów, Włodawa County in Lublin Voivodeship (east Poland)
Wojciechów, Kazimierza County in Świętokrzyskie Voivodeship (south-central Poland)
Wojciechów, Włoszczowa County in Świętokrzyskie Voivodeship (south-central Poland)
Wojciechów, Masovian Voivodeship (east-central Poland)
Wojciechów, Greater Poland Voivodeship (west-central Poland)
Wojciechów, Namysłów County in Opole Voivodeship (south-west Poland)
Wojciechów, Olesno County in Opole Voivodeship (south-west Poland)